Eanbald may refer to:

 Eanbald (died 796), Archbishop of York
 Eanbald (floruit 798), also Archbishop of York (died 808); also known as Eanbald II